Juuso Rajala (born August 27, 1988) is a Finnish ice hockey player who currently plays professionally in Finland for EHC Bayreuth of DEL2. He previously played in Liiga for Lukko, HC TPS, Espoo Blues, Ilves and KooKoo.

References

External links

1988 births
Living people
Ice hockey people from Tampere
EHC Bayreuth players
Dresdner Eislöwen players
HC TPS players
Hokki players
IF Troja/Ljungby players
Ilves players
Jokipojat players
KooKoo players
Leksands IF players
Lempäälän Kisa players
Lukko players
Rote Teufel Bad Nauheim players
Finnish ice hockey forwards